Axinidris luhya is a species of ant in the genus Axinidris. Described by Snelling in 2007, the species is known to be from Kenya, found on vegetation in forests.

References

Axinidris
Hymenoptera of Africa
Insects described in 2007